Bulgarian occupation of Serbia ( / Bugarska okupacija Srbije) may refer to:

Bulgarian occupation of Serbia (World War I)
Bulgarian occupation of Serbia (World War II)

See also 
 Bulgarian-Serbian War (disambiguation)
 Toplica Uprising

Bulgaria–Serbia relations